Sheldon Wolff (September 22, 1928, Peabody, Massachusetts – May 24, 2008, Mill Valley, California) was an American radiobiologist, cytogeneticist, and environmental health expert on mutagenic chemicals.

Biography
He graduated from Tufts College with a B.S. in 1950 and from Harvard University with an M.A. in 1951 and with a Ph.D. in 1953. His doctoral dissertation "Some aspects of the chemical protection against radiation damage to Vicia faba chromosomes" was supervised by Karl Sax. From 1953 to 1966 Wolff worked in the biology division of Oak Ridge National Laboratory (ORNL), where he studied radiation-induced cell damage. At the University of California, San Francisco (UCSF) he was a professor of cytogenetics and radiology from 1966 to 1996, when he retired as professor emeritus. As the successor to Harvey M. Patt, Wolff was from 1982 to 1996 the director of UCSF's Laboratory of Radiobiology and Environmental Health (LREH). During his tenure at UCSF he chaired for nine years the U.S. Department of Energy's Health and Environmental Research Advisory Committee (HERAC). From 1996 to 2000 he worked at a scientific laboratory in Hiroshima, Japan as vice chairman and chief of research of the Radiation Effects Research Foundation.

He received the 1973 Ernest Orlando Lawrence Award for "research leading to the classic observation that chromosomal damage is subject to metabolic repair processes, and thus laying the foundation for study of genetic repair mechanisms. His incisive cytogentic investigations of dose-effect relationships, dose fractionation, and other modifying."

Upon his death Wolff was survived by his widow, two sons, a daughter, and three grandchildren.

Selected publications
 
 
 
 
 
 
 
 
 
 
  1993

References

1928 births
2008 deaths
Tufts University School of Arts and Sciences alumni
Harvard University alumni
University of California, San Francisco faculty
Cell biologists
Radiobiologists
Radiation health effects researchers
People from Peabody, Massachusetts